Belton is a city in the U.S. state of Texas. Belton is the county seat of Bell County and is the fifth largest city in the Killeen-Temple metropolitan area. In 2020, the population of Belton was 23,054, and the metro region had a population of 450,051 according to US Census estimates.

History

Belton and Bell County have been the site of human habitation since at least 6000 BCE. Evidence of early inhabitants, including campsites, kitchen middens and burial mounds from the late prehistoric era have been discovered in the Stillhouse Hollow Lake and Belton Lake areas. The earliest identifiable inhabitants were the Tonkawa, who traditionally followed buffalo by foot. Belton was also home to the Lipan Apache, Wacos, Nadaco, Kiowas and Comanche. By the 1840s most tribes had been pushed out by settlements, but skirmishes with the Comanche existed until the early 1870s.

Belton was first settled 1850 and named Nolanville, taking the name of nearby Nolan Springs which were named for Texan explorer Philip Nolan. In 1851, it changed its name to Belton after being named the county seat of newly created Bell County named after Peter Hansborough Bell, the Governor of Texas at that time. In 1860, the population was 300, the largest in the county. During the run up to the civil war, Belton had a large pro-Union minority. A Whig Party paper and anti-secession paper called "The Independent" was published there and the city voted overwhelmingly for Sam Houston for governor, who was strongly against Texas secession. Nonetheless, in 1861 Bell County voted for secession and many residents fought in the Confederate Army. After the civil war, Belton experienced unrest. Several pro-union sympathizers were lynched in 1866 and Federal troops were called in to protect the Federal Judge serving in the city. After Reconstruction, the city, close to a major feeder of the Chisholm Trail, served as growing business center for the region.

In 1868, Martha McWhirter, a prominent figure in Belton's non-sectarian Union Sunday School, created the Woman's Commonwealth, the only Texas women's commune of the 1800s. The
commune started several business ventures including a successful hotel. In 1899, the group sold their holdings and relocated to Maryland. The town experienced rapid growth in the 1880s with the building of the courthouse, Baylor Female College buildings, and a "railroad war" in 
which, by 1881, Belton was bypassed by the Gulf, Colorado and Santa Fe Railroad, which built Temple, 8 miles to the east, as the local junction and depot town. In 1904, the town reported 
a population of 3,700. The town began to thrive and reached a population of 6,500 in 1928. However the town was decimated by the Great Depression and was down to a population of 3,779 only three years later in 1931.

The town began to recover in the run up to World War II as Fort Hood was opened nearby in 1942, housing the tank destroyer Tactical and Firing Center at Fort Hood. 
Encompassing over 200,000 acres and almost 90,000 troops, this brought a large population and a lot of economic activity to the area. By 1950, the city's population was back up to 6,246 and by 1990 had reached 12,476.

Geography

It is near the center of Bell County at  (31.058904, –97.463382). It is at the point where the Blackland Prairie, characterized by level ground and deep fertile soil, and the Edwards Plateau, characterized by its many springs, hills, and steep canyons, meet.

It is bordered to the northeast by the Leon River, across which is the city of Temple. Nolan Creek, a tributary of the Leon, runs through the center of Belton. It is also southeast of Belton Lake and northeast of Stillhouse Hollow Lake with both touching its city limits. The city limits extend south along Interstate 35 across the Lampasas River nearly to Salado. And abuts Temple City limits at the Leon River

Climate

Belton has a humid subtropical climate under the Köppen climate classification. This climate is typified by hot and muggy summers, short mild winters, and pleasantly warm spring and fall seasons. Belton averages  of annual rainfall and it is distributed mostly evenly throughout the year.

Snow is rare in Belton, and ground accumulation even rarer. There's an average of 0.1" of snow (0 cm). The month with the most snow is January, with 0.1" of snow (0.3 cm). However, February 2021 brought a snowstorm to Belton that impacted many homes, forcing many people to live without power or heat for as long as a week. The snow was thick and the ice was thicker, blocking roads and making it very dangerous to drive.

Although severe weather can & does occur, typically during the spring with supercell thunderstorms it does not fall within the conventional limits of tornado alley.

Demographics

As of the 2020 United States census, there were 23,054 people, 7,453 households, and 4,157 families residing in the city.

As of the census of 2000, there were 14,623 people, 4,742 households, and 3,319 families residing in the city. The population density was 1,171.3 people per square mile (452.4/km2). There were 5,089 housing units at an average density of 407.6 per square mile (157.4/km2). The racial makeup of the city was 72.67% White, 8.10% African American, 0.64% Native American, 0.95% Asian, 0.10% Pacific Islander, 14.83% from other races, and 2.71% from two or more races. Hispanic or Latino of any race were 25.13% of the population.

There were 4,742 households, out of which 37.3% had children under the age of 18 living with them, 49.9% were married couples living together, 16.1% had a female householder with no husband present, and 30.0% were non-families. 24.6% of all households were made up of individuals, and 10.6% had someone living alone who was 65 years of age or older. The average household size was 2.69 and the average family size was 3.23.

In the city, the population was spread out, with 26.9% under the age of 18, 18.4% from 18 to 24, 26.5% from 25 to 44, 17.1% from 45 to 64, and 11.1% who were 65 years of age or older. The median age was 28 years. For every 100 females, there were 95.0 males. For every 100 females age 18 and over, there were 90.4 males.

The median income for a household in the city was $32,052, and the median income for a family was $38,635. Males had a median income of $31,304 versus $20,678 for females. The per capita income for the city was $14,345. About 12.7% of families and 17.9% of the population were below the poverty line, including 20.7% of those under age 18 and 14.0% of those age 65 or over.

Education

Belton is served by the Belton Independent School District. The school district operates three high schools, four middle schools and nine elementary schools (a handful of which happen to be outside of the city's borders). The district and all of its campuses received the Texas Education Agency's highest accountability rating (met standard) based on student performance on the State of Texas Assessment of Academic Readiness. Both Belton High School & Belton New Tech High School have been included on lists of the nation's best high schools compiled by U.S. News & World Report and Newsweek. Belton New Tech High School and South Belton Middle School have been recognized as Apple Distinguished Schools for their implementation of the district's digital learning initiative. Belton ISD also offers prekindergarten at Belton Early Childhood School.

Falling in Temple, TX city limits but within the boundaries of Belton Independent School District is Central Texas Christian School a private Christian K–12 school with an enrollment of approximately 570 students.

Higher education

Belton is home to the University of Mary Hardin–Baylor. Founded in 1845, it is a private Christian university affiliated with the Baptist General Convention of Texas. Awarding degrees at the baccalaureate, master's, and doctoral levels it has an enrollment of 3,898.

Parks and recreation

The city maintains 13 city parks. Largest among them are Heritage Park, which is along the Leon River. Yettie Polk Park, which winds along Nolan Creek with a walking trail reaching from down and Interstate 35 to the University of Mary Hardin-Baylor, And Miller Springs Nature Center offering hiking trails along the Leon River below the Belton Lake Dam.

For recreation, Belton has two major lakes: Belton Lake on the Leon River, and Stillhouse Hollow Lake on the Lampasas River. Belton Lake has 11 public access parks owned and maintained by the United States Army Corps of Engineers. Stillhouse Lake has four with lake access. These parks offer many amenities such as boat docks, picnic areas, hike and bike trails, camping sites, public restroom facilities, marinas and designated sandy swimming beaches.

There is also a water park, Summer Fun Water Park, which features slides, a lazy river, and other fun activities. Food may also be purchased both inside and in a building just out side of Summer Fun which serves assorted snacks.

Notable people

 David Ash, football player, graduated from Belton High School
 Danny Barnes, musician 
 George Eads, actor, graduated from Belton High School
 Miriam Amanda Wallace "Ma" Ferguson, first female Governor of Texas   
 Jerry Grote, MLB baseball player, lives in Belton
 Rick Hoberg, comic artist of All-Star Squadron, Green Arrow and The Strangers
 George Jo Hennard, mass murderer, and perpetrator of the Luby's shooting
 Chris Marion, musician, of the Little River Band was born in Belton
 Khiry Robinson, NFL football player 
 Ricky Sanders, NFL football player, graduated from Belton High School
 Pat Seals, musician, from the alternative rock band Flyleaf
 Walton Walker, U.S. Army general officer killed in action in the Korean War
 Henry T. Waskow, the basis of a famous article by Ernie Pyle, was a Belton native
 William Wilbanks, American criminologist, Texas High School Basketball Hall of Fame member
 Rudy Youngblood, actor, graduated from Belton High School

Sports

Baseball
Red Murff Field (2005)

References

External links

 City of Belton official website
 The Belton Journal, Texas's oldest continuously published weekly newspaper (since 1866)
 SeeBelton - General info on Belton, including calendar of upcoming events

1850 establishments in Texas
Cities in Texas
Cities in Bell County, Texas
County seats in Texas
Killeen–Temple–Fort Hood metropolitan area
Populated places established in 1850